Miłosławice may refer to the following places in Poland:
Miłosławice, Lower Silesian Voivodeship (south-west Poland)
Miłosławice, Greater Poland Voivodeship (west-central Poland)